Kameyama may refer to:

Emperor Kameyama (1249–1305), emperor of Japan 1259–1274
Kameyama, Mie, a city in Mie prefecture, Japan

People with the surname
Keishi Kameyama, Japanese businessman
, Japanese voice actor

Japanese-language surnames